The Tacoma Stars are an American soccer organization that fields teams in both the indoor soccer Major Arena Soccer League and the National Premier Soccer League. Founded in 2003, the indoor team plays at ShoWare Center in Kent, Washington.

History

The Stars were founded in 2003 as a member of the Premier Arena Soccer League (PASL-Premier). The team is named after the Tacoma Stars that played in the original Major Indoor Soccer League from 1983 to 1992. The Stars won two PASL-Premier Championships (Summer 2004 & Winter 2009-2010).

The Stars made the transition to professional status and joined the Professional Arena Soccer League (PASL) for the 2010-11 season. In 2012–13 season, the head coach was Joe Waters as the team moved into the new Pacific Sports Center.

The Stars went on hiatus on August 23, 2013. An amateur version of the club participated in the Premier Arena Soccer League as the Tacoma Galaxy in the 2013-14 season. On January 10, 2014, the Pacific Sports Center was placed into receivership, putting the future of the facility and the franchise in question.

In June 2014, it was announced that the Tacoma Stars would return to play in the Western Indoor Soccer League (WISL) at the Tacoma Soccer Center.

In January 2015, team owner Lane Smith acquired the assets of the failed Seattle Impact of the Major Arena Soccer League and announced that the Stars would complete the Impact's 2014–15 season at the ShoWare Center in Kent, Washington, while completing their WISL obligations.

The Stars joined the National Premier Soccer League in 2020, fielding an outdoor team in the Northwest Conference through a partnership with Washington Premier FC. The outdoor team will play at Washington Premier FC Field in Waller, Washington, near Puyallup.

Year-by-year 

 Completing last 7 games of 20-game season after taking over for the Seattle Impact.

 First full season competing in MASL.

* The Stars had no home games due to the COVID-19 pandemic.

Professional Playoffs

* The Stars had no home games due to the COVID-19 pandemic.

Personnel

Active players
As of 22 May 2020.

Arena
 Starfire Sports Complex (2011-2012)
 Pacific Sports Center (2012–2013)
 Tacoma Soccer Center (2004-2011; 2014-2015)
 ShoWare Center (2015–present)

References

External links
 

 
2003 establishments in Washington (state)
Association football clubs established in 2003
Professional Arena Soccer League teams
Major Arena Soccer League teams
Sports in Tacoma, Washington
Soccer clubs in Washington (state)
Western Indoor Soccer League teams